Football at the 2002 Asian Games was held in Busan, Changwon, Yangsan and Ulsan, South Korea from 27 September to 13 October 2002.

Age limit for the men teams is under-23, same as the age limit in football competitions in Olympic Games, while three overage players are allowed among each squad.

Schedule

Medalists

Medal table

Draw

Group A
 
 
 
 

Group B
 
 
 
 

Group C
 
 
 
 

Group D
 
 
 
 *

Group E
 
 
 
 *

Group F
 
 *
 
 

* Mongolia and Jordan withdrew from the competition and were replaced by Afghanistan and Palestine. Tajikistan was suspended by FIFA and was replaced by North Korea.

Squads

Final standing

Men

Women

References

 Men's Results on RSSSF
 Women's Results on RSSSF

External links
 Official website

 
2002 Asian Games events
2002
Asian Games
2002 Asian Games
2002 in South Korean football